Aleksei Anatolyevich Lazarev (born 21 April 81) is a former Russian professional footballer.

Club career
He made his professional debut in the Russian Second Division in 1999 for FC Zenit-2 St. Petersburg.

Honours
 Russian Premier League bronze: 2001.

References

1981 births
Living people
Russian footballers
Association football defenders
Russian Premier League players
FC Zenit Saint Petersburg players
FC Metallurg Lipetsk players
FC Petrotrest players
FC Dynamo Saint Petersburg players
FC Zenit-2 Saint Petersburg players